Coast—Capilano was a federal electoral district in British Columbia, Canada, that was represented in the House of Commons of Canada from 1949 to 1968.

This riding was created in 1947 from parts of Vancouver North riding.

The riding consisted of Vancouver's North Shore suburbs, the then-municipality of West Vancouver (now a city) and the city and the western part of the district municipality of North Vancouver plus the mainland Sunshine Coast areas of the former Comox—Atlin riding.

Members of Parliament

Election results

See also
List of Canadian federal electoral districts
Past Canadian electoral districts

External links
Riding history from the Library of Parliament

Former federal electoral districts of British Columbia